Interstate 80 (I-80) in the US state of Nebraska runs east from the Wyoming state border across the state to Omaha. Construction of the stretch of I-80 spanning the state was completed on October 19, 1974. Nebraska was the first state in the nation to complete its mainline Interstate Highway System.

I-80 has over 80 exits in Nebraska; according to The New York Times there are several notable tourist attractions along Nebraska's section of I-80. It is the only Interstate Highway to travel from one end of Nebraska to another, as the state has no major north–south Interstate route. Except for a  portion of I-76 near the Colorado state line, I-80 is the only primary (two-digit) Interstate Highway in Nebraska.

History 

Built along the pathway of the Great Platte River Road, I-80 in Nebraska follows the same route as many historic trails, including the Oregon, California, and Mormon trails. Starting in 1957 after federal funding was allotted, Nebraskans began planning their Interstate construction. Led by the Nebraska State Highway Commission, there were hearings across the state to decide where the route was going to be. Aside from the federally mandated "control points" in Omaha, Lincoln, and Grand Island, the route could vary across the state. Dozens of meetings were held in Grand Island, Kearney, and North Platte, among other locations. The commission addressed issues of whether the highway would be north or south of the Platte River or whether it would follow US Highway 30 (US-30). The South Platte Chamber of Commerce and various cities were very active in these sessions, and debate over where the Interstate would be constructed continued into the 1960s.

After the first contract for building the Interstate was awarded in 1957, a  section near Gretna was the first section to be completed that year. The first long segment to be opened was a  section between Dodge Street in Omaha and the West Lincoln interchange in Lincoln on August 11, 1961. During a "Golden Link" ceremony, the last section of I-80 in Nebraska was completed when a brass connector was inserted in the roadway near Sidney on October 20, 1974. This was designed to emulate the golden spike ceremonially used to complete the first transcontinental railroad in 1869.

Legacy 
The beginning of the I-80 construction in Nebraska in 1957 led the Nebraska Legislature to split the Department of Roads and Irrigation to create three separate agencies in the state, including the Department of Motor Vehicles, Department of Water Resources, and the Department of Roads, which was the first Nebraska agency solely responsible for highway planning, construction, and maintenance in Nebraska history.

Interstate construction led the state to focus on other highways in Nebraska, as well. Surfaced shoulders, new safety sections beyond shoulders, and other developments across the state were attributed to the influence of the Interstate. The 1965 state legislature also authorized a study of the needs of every public road in Nebraska, including state highways, county roads, and city streets.

Speed limits 

The following are speed limits that have existed on I-80 in Nebraska since it was opened in 1957.

Route description

Designated sections 

The entirety of the Interstate Highway System was named the "Dwight D. Eisenhower System of Interstate and Defense Highways" in 1990, and the first signage in Nebraska was posted in 1993. Several sections of I-80 in Nebraska have special designations. The I-80 intersection with US-34 has been designated a "Purple Heart Memorial Highway", and South 108th Street bridge over I-80 in Omaha has been designated the "Purple Heart Bridge", both in honor of all recipients of the Purple Heart. A section of I-80 in Nebraska is also designated as a Blue Star Memorial Highway.

Details 
The I-80 right-of-ways in Nebraska feature 28 types of grasses and forbs, 31 types of shrubs, 12 varieties of coniferous trees, and 39 types of deciduous trees are planted on the median of I-80 in Nebraska. There are also 570 informational and directional signs along the way. Milemarkers with the Interstate shield are posted every  from mile 103 to mile 312 and every  from mile 312 easterly. Most of the route is straight plains, and a stretch between Lincoln and Grand Island is almost entirely straight with very few curves whatsoever.

Exit list

Auxiliary routes 
I-80 has three auxiliary routes in Nebraska. One is a loop around the city of Omaha, one is a loop through the city of Omaha, and the other is a spur into Lincoln.

 is a spur into downtown Lincoln, cosigned with US-34 for its entire length.
 is a loop route in Omaha extending from I-29 in Council Bluffs, Iowa, west toward I-80. It serves as the inner of two loops in Omaha.
 is a loop around the northwest of Omaha. It serves as the outer of the two Omaha loops. The section from I-80 in Omaha to I-29 in Crescent, Iowa, was originally designated as I-280, but, because it extended into Iowa and because it conflicted with I-280 in the Quad Cities area of Iowa, the route was renumbered I-680.

See also 

 History of Nebraska
 Transportation in Omaha, Nebraska

Notes

References

Footnotes

Works cited

External links 

 Nebraska Department of Roads
 1963 photos of construction in Omaha.
 I-80 Nebraska. An official promotional website for nine counties in central and western Nebraska.

Expressways in the Omaha area
80
 Nebraska
 Monuments and memorials in Nebraska
Transportation in Kimball County, Nebraska
Transportation in Cheyenne County, Nebraska
Transportation in Deuel County, Nebraska
Transportation in Keith County, Nebraska
Transportation in Lincoln County, Nebraska
Transportation in Dawson County, Nebraska
Transportation in Buffalo County, Nebraska
Transportation in Hall County, Nebraska
Transportation in Hamilton County, Nebraska
Transportation in York County, Nebraska
Transportation in Seward County, Nebraska
Transportation in Lincoln, Nebraska
Transportation in Cass County, Nebraska
Transportation in Sarpy County, Nebraska